Federico Taddia (born 7 February 1972, in Pieve di Cento) is an Italian radio host, television presenter, journalist and author.

References

1972 births
Living people